The 2015–16 season is FK Partizan's 10th season in Serbian SuperLiga. This article shows player statistics and all matches (official and friendly) that the club have and will play during the 2015–16 season.

Transfers

In

Out

For recent transfers, see List of Serbian football transfers winter 2015-16. For summer transfers, see List of Serbian football transfers summer 2015.

Players

Top scorers

Competitions

Overview

Serbian SuperLiga

League table

Matches

Serbian Cup

Serbian Cup

UEFA Champions League

Second qualifying round

Third qualifying round

Play-off round

UEFA Europa League

Group stage

Friendlies

Sponsors

References

External links

 Partizanopedia 2015-16

FK Partizan seasons
Partizan
Partizan